Anna Maria Antonie of Liechtenstein (11 September 1699 in Vienna – 20 January 1753 in Vienna), was a princess consort of Liechtenstein; married 19 April 1718 to her cousin prince Joseph Wenzel I, Prince of Liechtenstein.

Marriage and issue
Anna Maria married firstly Count Johann Ernst of Thun-Hohenstein (1694–1717), in 1716, without issue.

Anna Maria married secondly her cousin, Joseph Wenzel I of Liechtenstein (1696–1772), in 1718. They had five children, all of whom died in early childhood:

 Prince Philipp Anton (1719).
 Prince Philipp Anton (1720).
 Prince Philipp Ernst (1722–1723).
 Princess Maria Elisabeth (1724).
 Princess Marie Alexandra  (1727).

Ancestry

Sources 
 Principality of Liechtenstein

References 

1699 births
1753 deaths
Princely consorts of Liechtenstein
Nobility from Vienna
18th-century Liechtenstein women
Daughters of monarchs